Buchnera americana, commonly known as American bluehearts or bupleurum, is a locally endangered herbaceous perennial plant of the broomrape family Orobanchaceae.  Found widely across the eastern United States, it also occurs in one location in the Canadian province of Ontario.

Description
Buchnera americana is a perennial flowering plant with underground rhizomes and an above-ground stem. The leaves are opposed, meaning that they grow in pairs, sprouting directly across from each other. The flowers are light purple. The fruits are dark purple and form in capsules  in length. The plant blooms year round, but the flowers are at their peak between June and September. During the remaining months of the year, the petals darken and dry up.

Distribution and habitat
Bluehearts are found in 12 states, ranging from Ohio to Florida. They are most common in Missouri and Tennessee, where they are abundant in moist environments. The plant also occurs in a small area of south-western Ontario  from Lake Huron.

Buchnera americana is mostly found along the edges of wet depressions, in limestone glades, prairies, moist sandy soils, and open woods. It sometimes forms a hemiparasitic relationship with a tree (any of several species) by attaching itself to the root system.

Conservation
In Canada, Buchnera americana is only found in "a  stretch of the shoreline of Lake Huron in South-western Ontario". Only six populations exist, and they are considered Endangered provincially and nationally.

In the United States, bluehearts are found in 11 states, from Ohio and Indiana to Georgia and Missouri. They are state ranked from S1 to S5 according to their degree of occurrence: S1 is extremely rare and S5 is secure. In Georgia and Virginia bluehearts are listed as S1; they are listed as S2 in Ohio and Texas; they are listed as S3 in Illinois, Kansas, Tennessee and parts of Kentucky; they are listed as S4 in Arkansas, Missouri and parts of Kentucky.

In Ontario their natural interdunal habitats are threatened by development for housing, cottages and recreational areas, such as parks where the flowers are stepped on or picked. In the United States, bluehearts live in prairie habitats, where fire is a necessary disturbance for seed germination and growth of other plants. Since burning needs to occur in a rotational 3–4 year cycle in Indiana, Illinois, Missouri and Ohio, Bluehearts are greatly affected by habitat loss in these areas of the United States.

Ecological importance 
Bluehearts are hemiparasitic, meaning they are able to grow independently without a host but grow more strongly with a host. They attach to their host plant by parasitic roots called haustoria. During stressful conditions (such as drought), bluehearts may heighten their parasitic effects to the point where a large group of them may damage small trees. Common host trees of bluehearts are white oak (Quercus alba), eastern white pine (Pinus strobus), green ash (Fraxinus pennsylvanica), and cottonwood (Populus deltoides). Caterpillars of the common buckeye (Junonia coenia) feed on the blueheart.

Uses 
Buchnera americana has no known medicinal uses. In the garden, this plant is highly attractive to bees, butterflies, and birds.

References

External links
 USDA Plants Profile for Buchnera americana (American bluehearts)

Orobanchaceae
Flora of Ontario
Flora of the North-Central United States
Flora of the Northeastern United States
Flora of the Southeastern United States
Flora of Texas
Plants described in 1753
Taxa named by Carl Linnaeus
Flora without expected TNC conservation status